The 19th Premios Juventud ceremony took place on July 21, 2022. Univision broadcast the show live from the José Miguel Agrelot Coliseum, with Danna Paola, Eduin Caz, Clarissa Molina and Prince Royce hosting the event.

Performers

Winners and nominees 
The nominees were announced on June 14, 2022.  The winners are listed in bold.

General 
Artist of the Youth – Male
Bad Bunny
Camilo
Christian Nodal
El Alfa
Farruko
J Balvin
Maluma
Rauw Alejandro
Romeo Santos
Sebastián Yatra

Artist of the Youth – Female
Karol G
Ángela Aguilar
Anitta
Becky G
Kali Uchis
María Becerra
Natti Natasha
Nicki Nicole
Rosalía
Sofía Reyes

Favorite Group or Duo of the Year
Grupo Firme
Calibre 50
CNCO
Gente de Zona
Jesse & Joy
Los Ángeles Azules
Maná
Mau y Ricky
Reik
Wisin & Yandel

Album of the Year  
KG0516 – Karol GDharma – Sebastián Yatra
Jose – J Balvin
La 167 – Farruko
La Última Promesa – Justin Quiles
Legendaddy – Daddy Yankee
Mis Manos – Camilo
Motomami – Rosalía
Nattividad – Natti Natasha
Viceversa – Rauw Alejandro

The Catchiest Song  "Provenza" – Karol G"A La Antigüita" – Calibre 50
"Envolver" – Anitta
"In da Getto" – J Balvin & Skrillex
"Lao’ A Lao" – Prince Royce
"Pa’lla Voy" – Marc Anthony
"Pepas" – Farruko
"Sus Huellas" – Romeo Santos
"Todo de Ti" – Rauw Alejandro
"Ya Supérame (En vivo)" – Grupo Firme

Best Girl Power Collab "Mamiii" – Becky G & Karol G"24/7" – Sofía Reyes & The Change
"Báilalo Mujer" – Flor de Rap & Denise Rosenthal
"Hasta los Dientes" – Camila Cabello & María Becerro
"La Niña De La Escuela" – Lola Índigo, Tini & Belinda
"Linda" – Tokischa & Rosalía
"Pa Mis Muchachas" – Christina Aguilera, Becky G, Nicki Nicole feat. Nathy Peluso
"Piketona"" – Lele Pons & Kim Loaiza
"Roce" – Paopao, La Gabi, Villano Antillano, Aria Vega & Cami Da Baby
"Yummy Yummy Love" – Momoland & Natti Natasha

The New Generation – Female  Evaluna MontanerBad Gyal
Corina Smith
Ingratax
Kim Loaiza
La Gabi
Las Villa
Lola Indigo
Ptazeta
Tokischa

The New Generation – Male  Ryan CastroAlejo
Blessd
Boza
Duki
Lit Killah
Luis Vazquez
Ovi
Robi
Tiago Pzk

Male Artist – On The Rise El AlfaEladio Carrión
Feid
Jay Wheeler
Jhayco
Justin Quiles
Lenny Tavárez
Mora
Paulo Londra
Sech

Female Artist – On The Rise  Ángela AguilarCazzu
Emilia
Farina
Kali Uchis
María Becerra
Mariah Angeliq
Nathy Peluso
Nicki Nicole
Tini

My Favorite Streaming Artist Karol GAnitta
Bad Bunny
Camilo
Christian Nodal
Daddy Yankee
Farruko
Grupo Firme
J Balvin
Rauw Alejandro

Best Song by a Couple  "Índigo" – Camilo & Evaluna Montaner"Att: Amor" – Greeicy & Mike Bahía
"Dangerous" – Nicki Nicole, Trueno & Bizarrap
"Esto Recién Empieza" – Duki & Emilia
"Si Tú Me Busca" – Anuel AA & Yailin La Más Viral

The Perfect Mix "El Incomprendido" – Farruko, Víctor Cárdenas & DJ Adoni"Canción Bonita" – Carlos Vives & Ricky Martin
"Emojis De Corazones" – Wisin, Jhayco & Ozuna feat. Los Legendarios
"Fan De Tus Fotos" – Nicky Jam & Romeo Santos
"Mojando Asientos" – Maluma & Feid
"Pareja del Año" – Sebastián Yatra & Myke Towers
"Se Menea" – Don Omar & Nio García
"Una Nota" – J Balvin & Sech
"Volví" – Aventura & Bad Bunny
"Wow BB" – Natti Natasha, El Alfa & Chimbala

Collaboration OMG "Don´t Be Shy" – Tiësto & Karol G"Kesi" (Remix) – Camilo & Shawn Mendes
"La Fama" – Rosalía & The Weeknd
"Mamá Tetema" – Maluma feat. Rayvanny
"Nostálgico" – Rvssian, Rauw Alejandro & Chris Brown
"Oh Na Na" – Camila Cabello, Myke Towers & Tainy
"Santo" – Christina Aguilera & Ozuna
"SG" – DJ Snake, Ozuna, Megan Thee Stallion & Lisa of Blackpink
"Sigue" – J Balvin & Ed Sheeran
"Tacones Rojos" – Sebastián Yatra & John Legend

Viral Track of the Year  "Pepas" – Farruko"Envolver" (Remix) – Anitta & Justin Quiles
"Índigo" – Camilo & Evaluna Montaner
"Mamiii" – Becky G & Karol G
"Medallo" – Blessd, Justin Quiles & Lenny Tavárez
"Poblado" (Remix) – J Balvin, Karol G & Nicky Jam feat. Crissin, Totoy El Frío & Natan y Shander
"Qué Más Pues?" – J Balvin & María Becerra
"Sobrio" – Maluma
"Todo De Ti" – Rauw Alejandro
"Yonaguni" – Bad Bunny

The Best "Beatmakers"  Ovy On The DrumsAlbert Hype
Bizarrap
Caleb Calloway
Edgar Barrera
Los Legendarios
Mr. Naisgai
MVSIS
Sky Rompiendo
Tainy

The Hottest Choreography  "Envolver" – Anitta"Chicken Teriyaki" – Rosalía
"Disciplina" – Lali
"Todo De Ti" – Rauw Alejandro
"Wow BB" – Natti Natasha, El Alfa & Chimbala

 Regional Mexican 
Regional Mexican Album of the Year Mexicana Enamorada – Ángela AguilarAlma Vacía – Ivan Cornejo
Del Barrio Hasta Aquí, Vol. 2 – Fuerza Regida
Esta Vida Es Muy Bonita – Banda el Recodo de Cruz Lizárraga
Inédito – Carin León
La Ley De La Vida – Luis Ángel ‘El Flaco’
Mi Herencia, Mi Sangre – Majo Aguilar
Mi Vida En Un Cigarro 2 – Junior H
Vamos Bien – Calibre 50
Ya Solo Eres Mi Ex – La Adictiva Banda San José de Mesillas

Best Regional Mexican Song "Ya Supérame" (en vivo)" – Grupo Firme"Ahí Donde Me Ven" – Ángela Aguilar
"A La Antigüita" – Calibre 50
"La Casita" – Banda MS de Sergio Lizárraga
"¿Qué Tienen Tus Palabras?" – Banda el Recodo de Cruz Lizárraga
"Sin Miedo Al Éxito" – Banda Los Sebastianes
"Soy Buen Amigo" – El Fantasma
"Soy El Único" – Yahritza y Su Esencia
"Ya No Somos Ni Seremos" – Christian Nodal
"Ya Solo Eres Mi Ex" – La Adictiva Banda San José de Mesillas

Best Regional Mexican Collaboration "En Tu Perra Vida" – Grupo Firme & Lenin Ramírez"2 Veces" – Los Plebes Del Rancho de Ariel Camacho & Christian Nodal
"Amores Van y Vienen" – La Nueva Estrategia & La Maquinaria Norteña
"El Columpio" – Banda Los Sebastianes & Los Rieleros del Norte
"El Triste Alegre" (en vivo) – Banda Carnava & Calibre 50
"La Sinvergüenza" – Christian Nodal & Banda MS de Sergio Lizárraga
"Mariachi Tumbado" – Danny Felix feat. Mariachi Vargas de Tecalitlán
"Mariposa Traicionera" – Maná & Alejandro Fernández
"Señorita Cantinera" – Los Rieleros del Norte feat. Polo Urías y su Máquina Norteña
"Te Encontré" – Ulices Chaidez  & Eslabon Armado

Best Regional Mexican Fusion  "Cada Quien" – Grupo Firme & Maluma"Como Lo Hice Yo" – Matisse & Carin León
"Ella Qué Te Dio" – Ángela Aguilar & Jesse & Joy
"Está Dañada" (Remix) – Ivan Cornejo & Jhayco
"Fino Licor" – Gerardo Ortíz feat. Piso 21
"Las Locuras Mías" – Omar Chaparro feat. Joey Montana
"Monterrey" – Guaynaa & Pain Digital
"Otra Noche" – Los Ángeles Azules & Nicki Nicole
"Qué Bueno Es Tenerte" – Natalia Jiménez & Banda MS de Sergio Lizárraga
"Te Lloré Un Río" – Maná & Christian Nodal

The New Generation – Regional Mexican  Santa Fe KlanDannylux
Gera Mx
Ivan Cornejo
Los Del Limit
Luis R Conriquez
Lupita Infante
Majo Aguilar
Ramón Vega
Yahritza y Su Esencia

 Tropical 
Best Tropical Hit  "Sus Huellas" – Romeo Santos"Agüita E Coco" – Kany García
"Cartas Sobre La Mesa" – Gilberto Santa Rosa
"Cumbiana" – Carlos Vives
"Hasta El Sol De Hoy" (Versión Salsa) – Luis Figueroa
"Lao’ A Lao" – Prince Royce
"No Hay" – El Gran Combo De Puerto Rico
"Pa’lla Voy" – Marc Anthony
"Pa’ Que Me Perdones" – Héctor Acosta ‘El Torito’
"Tu Fan" – Luis Vazquez

Best Tropical Mix  "Te Espero" – Prince Royce & María Becerra"Besos En Cualquier Horario" – Carlos Vives, Mau y Ricky & Lucy Vives
"Dame Una Noche" – Manny Cruz, Daniel Santacruz & Nacho
"Dios Así Lo Quiso" – Ricardo Montaner & Juan Luis Guerra 4.40
"Háblame de Miami" – Gente de Zona & Maffio
"La Bendición" – Farruko & Lenier
"Lluvia y Samba" – Elvis Crespo, Gilberto Santa Rosa & Alex Bueno
"Pa’mi" – Peter Nieto & Ivy Queen
"Señor Juez" – Ozuna & Romeo Santos
"Tú No Bailas Más Que Yo" – Jerry Rivera & Don Omar

 Digital 
Video with Best Social Message "Niño Soñador" – J Balvin"DPM (De P*ta Madre)" – Kany García
"Gracias" – Pedro Capó
"My Lova" – Farruko
"This Is Not America" – Residente feat. Ibeyi

Popular Artist or InfluencerKarol G 
Ángela Aguilar
Danna Paola
Domelipa
Eduin Caz
El Alfa
Karol Sevilla
Kim Loaiza
Lele Pons
Luisito Comunica

Best Social Media Power CoupleBecky G & Sebastian Lletget Anuel AA & Yailin La Más Viral
Emilia & Duki
Gabriel Soto & Irina Baeva
Juanpa Zurita & Macarena Achaga

Best Fandom CNCO – CNCOwnersÁngela Aguilar – Angelitos
Camilo – La Tribu
Carlos Rivera – Riveristas
Jay Wheeler – Rueditas
Tini – Tinistas

Best Social Dance Challenge  "Don´t Be Shy" – Tiësto & Karol G"Bombón" – Daddy Yankee, El Alfa & Lil Jon
"Envolver" – Anitta
"Fiel" – Los Legendarios, Wisin & Jhayco
"Fuera del Mercado" – Danny Ocean
"In Da Getto" – J Balvin & Skrillex
"Jordan" – Ryan Castro
"Linda" – Tokischa & Rosalía
"Mon Amour" (Remix) – Zzoilo & Aitana
"Problemón" – Álvaro Díaz & Rauw Alejandro

Trendiest Artist Karol GBad Bunny
Danna Paola
Emilia
Goyo
Grupo Firme
J Balvin
Maluma
Rauw Alejandro
Reik

 Television 
My Favorite Actor Sebastián Rulli – Vencer el pasado
Gabriel Soto – Soltero con hijas
Jesús Zavala – Búnker
José Ron – La desalmada
Oscar Isaac – Moon Knight

My Favorite Actress 
Danna Paola – Elite
Angelique Boyer – Vencer el pasado
Carolina Miranda - ¿Quién mató a Sara?
Macarena Achaga – Luis Miguel: The Series
Yalitza Aparicio – Hijas de Brujas

Best On-Screen Couple 
Angelique Boyer & Sebastián Rulli – Vencer el pasado
Livia Brito & José Ron – La desalmada
Maite Perroni & Alejandro Speitzer – Oscuro deseo
Susana González & David Zepeda – Mi fortuna es amarte
Úrsula Corberó & Miguel Herrán – La casa de papel

References

2022 music awards
2022 awards in the United States
2022 in Latin music